Series 7 may refer to:
The seventh season of any of many shows or series; see  and 
Series 7 exam, officially the General Securities Representative Exam, the most comprehensive financial securities exam offered by the FINRA
Series 7: The Contenders, a movie made in 2001. This film is also commonly referred to as Series 7
Series 7 or Series VII, a size of Photographic Filter used on cameras and other optical devices
Series 7, often used to describe the BMW 7 Series of automobiles
 Series 7 olinsky sable-hair brushes from Winsor & Newton
Psion Series 7, a notebook computer from Psion
Series of seven

See also
700 series (disambiguation)
System 7 (disambiguation)